Thomas Hudson, (died in or before 1605) was a musician and poet from the north of England present at the Scottish court of King James VI at the end of the 16th century. Both he and his brother Robert Hudson were members of the Castalian Band, a group of court poets and musicians headed by the King in the 1580s and 1590s.

The Hudson brothers came to Scotland in the retinue of Lord Darnley. They joined the household of the infant James VI of Scotland at Stirling Castle as viola players and were listed in the household on 10 March 1568 as "Mekill [Big] Thomas Hudson, Robert Huson, James Hudson, William Hudson", with their servant William Fowlartoun. William Hudson was paid to teach the king to dance and was called the "master balladin".

The "violeris" were bought costumes in December 1579 for a court masque, apparently Navigatioun written by Alexander Montgomerie. It involved the torchlit entrance at Holyrood Palace of a narrator and his companions, a "Turk, the More, and the Egyptien". The musicians were bought "mask claithis" comprising red and yellow taffeta with swords and daggers. Montgomerie's prologue alludes to the Magi and Epiphany to flatter James VI as the Northern Star. James was also characterised as Solomon. The masque was followed by dancing.

James Hudson became involved in diplomacy and wrote many letters to the English diplomat George Nicholson.

In 1584 Thomas Hudson translated Judith by Guillaume de Salluste Du Bartas, an account of the biblical character written at the command of Jeanne III of Navarre.

References

The Middle English Metrical Paraphrase of the Old Testament by Russell A. Peck
Historie of Judith, by Thomas Hudson, ed. James Craigie. Scottish Text Society, series 3, vol. 14. Edinburgh and London: William Blackwood and Sons, 1941. (A translation from Guillaume de Salluste Du Bartas, first published by Thomas Vatroullier, Edinburgh, 1584.)
See Thomas Hudson, found in Dictionary of National Biography, 1885–1900, Volume 28.

16th-century English poets
16th-century births
1600s deaths
16th-century Scottish writers
16th-century male writers
16th-century Scottish poets
16th-century English musicians
16th-century Scottish musicians
Castalian Band
English male poets
Court of Mary, Queen of Scots
Court of James VI and I
English viol players
People of Stirling Castle